Aristidis 'Aris' Xevgenis (born 12 May 1981) is a Greek footballer who plays for Nafpaktiakos Asteras.

Born in Agrinio, Xevghenis began his professional career with Panetolikos F.C. in August 2004, having previously played for the club in the Delta Ethniki.

References

External links
Profile at Onsports.gr

1981 births
Greek footballers
Association football forwards
Aiolikos F.C. players
Panetolikos F.C. players
Living people
Footballers from Agrinio